Atari SA (formerly Infogrames Entertainment SA) is a French video game holding company headquartered in Paris. Its subsidiaries include Atari Interactive and Atari, Inc.  It is the current owner of the Atari brand through Atari Interactive. Because of continuing pressures upon the company and difficulty finding investors, it sought bankruptcy protection under French law in January 2013; its subsidiaries in the United States have sought Chapter 11 bankruptcy protection as well. All three subsidiaries have since exited bankruptcy.

History

Early history (1983–1996) 
The founders wanted to christen the company Zboub Système (which can be approximately translated to Dick System in English), but were dissuaded by their legal counsel. According to Bonnell in a TV interview, they then used a mix-and-match computer program to suggest other names, one of which was "Infogramme":  a portmanteau of the French words "informatique" (information technology) and "programme" (computer program). The final choice, Infogrames, was a slightly modified version of that suggestion.

The company logo and mascot is an armadillo (tatou in French), chosen when the company was moved to Villeurbanne. Bonnell commented: "This dinosaur is our symbol. The armadillo has always survived changes to its environment, from the melting of glaciers to the worst of heat waves."

In the late 1980s, Infogrames was noted for its French computer games that often featured original game ideas and occasionally humorous content. They had acquired several licences for popular Franco-Belgian comics.

In 1992, they released Alone in the Dark, a 3D horror adventure game, to international attention.

By 1995, Infogrames was held by many shareholders, including a 20% stake from Pathé Interactive (joint-venture between Phillips Media and Chargeurs) and 3.3% by Productions Marcel Dassault. By August, Phillips Media acquired Chargeurs' stake in Pathé Interactive, which led to the 20% shareholding stake of the company transferring fully over to Phillips.

Growth through acquisition (1996–2000)

In 1996, Infogrames embarked on an acquisition campaign that would last seven years and cost more than $500 million; the objective was to become the world's leading interactive entertainment publisher. While the company's debt increased from $55 million in 1999 to $493 million in 2002, the company's revenue also increased from $246 million to $650 million during the same period.

The company began their acquisitions by purchasing the British-based holding company Ocean International Ltd. for $100 million, with their UK and US subsidiaries rebranding as distribution arms of Infogrames. This was followed up with the purchase of French distributor Phillips Media for ₣191.5 million, which also included two German companies, distributor Bomico Entertainment Software GmbH and publisher Laguna Video Games, but didn't include the UK-based Leisuresoft.

In 1998, Infogrames acquired three distributors; ABS Multimedia, Arcadia, and the Swiss Gamecity GmbH, followed with a 62.5% in the Australian game distributor OziSoft in December following its then-recent relinquishment from Sega, followed up in February 1999 with a 50% stake in Canal+ Multimedia and the purchase of the Gremlin Group for $40 million in March, which included developers Gremlin Interactive and DMA Design. The former was renamed as Infogrames Sheffield House, while the latter was soon sold by Infogrames to Take-Two Interactive.

On April 5, 1999, Infogrames purchased the Paris-based development studio of Psygnosis. On April 20, the company made another major acquisition by purchasing Accolade for $60 million, which was renamed as Infogrames North America, Inc., and the Australian-based Beam Software, which was renamed to Infogrames Melbourne House Pty Ltd.

In December 1999, Infogrames bought 70% of GT Interactive for $135 million, and assumed the new subsidiary's $75 million bank debt. IESA justified the purchase by stating that GT Interactive provided Infogrames with a "distribution network for all of its products in the United States, as well as a catalog of products that includes Driver, Duke Nukem, Oddworld, Unreal Tournament and Deer Hunter". By June 2000 Infogrames had invested another $30 million in GT Interactive, and renamed the publisher as Infogrames, Inc. immediately. Included in the GT Interactive purchase were the game development studios SingleTrac, Humongous Entertainment, Legend Entertainment and Reflections Interactive; however, SingleTrac was closed down by the end of the year.

In 2000, the developer Paradigm Entertainment was bought for $19.5 million and in-flight games developer Den-o-Tech Int. (DTI), later renamed to Infogrames DTI, was also acquired for $5.6 million. In June 2000, the company was one of the interested parties to acquire Eidos Interactive.

In January 2001, IESA purchased Hasbro Interactive and the handheld game console Game.com from Hasbro for $100 million; with $95 million as 4.5 million common shares of Infogrames and $5 million in cash. With the acquisition of Hasbro Interactive, which was renamed as Infogrames Interactive, Inc., IESA became the owner of the MicroProse and Atari brand names, alongside titles such as Civilization, Falcon, RollerCoaster Tycoon, Centipede, Missile Command, and Pong. Under the terms of the sale agreement, Infogrames gained the exclusive rights to develop and publish games based on Hasbro properties, which included Dungeons & Dragons, Mr. Potato Head, My Little Pony and others, for a period of 15 years plus an option for an additional 5 years based on performance. In October, Infogrames announced to "reinvent" the Atari brand with the launch of three new games featuring prominent Atari branding on their boxarts: Splashdown, MX Rider and TransWorld Surf. The company focused the Atari brand mainly for console games aimed at a 18–34 year-old demographic. PC, educational and casual games retained the Infogrames banner.

In April 2002, the company's Japanese division Infogrames Japan K.K. signed a Japanese distribution deal with Konami for select titles and soon relaunched the Atari brand in the country with the publication of Splashdown, TransWorld Surf and V-Rally 3 in the region. In May, Infogrames purchased Shiny Entertainment from Interplay Entertainment for $47 million, with the purchase also including exclusive publishing rights to publish games based on The Matrix. In October, Infogrames acquired the remaining 80% of Eden Studios for $4.1 million, and IESA bought the remaining shares of OziSoft and other share holders for $3.7 million, then renamed them to Infogrames Australia Pty, Ltd. and Infogrames New Zealand Pty, Ltd. During 2002, the company shuttered their Chippenham and Lyon House development studios. In the fiscal year of 2002, IESA had a net loss of $67 million on revenues of $650 million, and in 2003 the net losses increased to $89 million.

Rebranding to Atari (2003-2006)

On 7 May 2003, IESA officially reorganized its subsidiaries under Atari branded names and became a holding company. Infogrames, Inc. was renamed as Atari, Inc., Infogrames Interactive, Inc. to Atari Interactive, Inc., a wholly owned subsidiary of IESA, Infogrames Australia Pty Ltd to Atari Australia Pty Ltd, renamed Infogrames Melbourne House Pty Ltd to Atari Melbourne House Pty Ltd, Infogrames UK to Atari UK, and Infogrames Europe to Atari Europe.

Atari is a public company that, as of 2007, had, as a majority stockholder, the company California U.S. Holdings, Inc., a wholly owned subsidiary of IESA.  Atari licences the Atari trademark from Atari Interactive, a licence which was set to expire in 2013. Atari, Inc. has the rights to publish and sublicense in North America certain intellectual properties either owned or licensed by IESA or its subsidiaries, including Atari Interactive. Atari's Australian subsidiary also distributes games for Konami of Europe, Codemasters UK, Eidos Interactive and SCi. Konami has an Australian headquarters but this is for Konami's Gaming Machines.

By 2003, the company continued to shutter more development studios, with Sheffield House, Atari Hunt Valley, and Legend Entertainment all closing within this time.

On July 29, 2004, Epic Games, the developer behind the Unreal franchise, announced they had ended their publishing contract with Atari and signed a three-game publishing deal with Midway Games beginning with Unreal Championship 2: The Liandri Conflict in 2005, although Atari would continue to publish the existing back catalog of titles. On November 25, 2004, Infogrames sold the Civilization franchise to an undisclosed partner for $22.3 million., revealed to be Take-Two Interactive the following year in January, purchasing all previous titles and other Sid Meier titles previously handled by Infogrames, such as the then-recent Sid Meier's Pirates! after signing a new deal with Firaxis Games.

On June 9, 2005, Hasbro bought back the digital gaming rights for their properties from Atari for $65 million. Within the deal, Hasbro purchased back the video game rights to Transformers, My Little Pony, Tonka, Magic: The Gathering, Connect Four, Candy Land and Playskool, while obtaining a seven-year exclusive deal to produce video games based on Monopoly, Scrabble, Game of Life, Battleship, Clue, Yahtzee, Simon, Risk and Boggle, alongside an expanded separate deal with the Dungeons & Dragons franchise.

Profit losses (2006-2008)
Infogrames through the remainder of 2006 sold intellectual properties and some studios in order to raise cash and stave off the threat of bankruptcy.

Their first sell-offs were on May 10, 2006, when they sold Games.com site to AOL, Paradigm Entertainment and the Stuntman franchise to THQ and the publishing rights to TimeShift to Vivendi Games. The sales generated $25 million in revenue. On June 17, 2006, Midway acquired the publishing rights to the Unreal back catalogue from Infogrames, this was followed on in when developer Reflections Interactive and the Driver franchise were sold for $21.6 million to Ubisoft. In October, Shiny Entertainment was acquired by Foundation 9 Entertainment for $1.6 million., with the last studio put up for sale - Atari Melbourne House, being sold to Krome Studios in November 2006, and was renamed to Krome Studios Melbourne. After this the only developers still owned by Atari were Eden Games and Humongous, Inc.

On September 1, 2006, Atari, Inc. announced that its stock faced delisting from the Nasdaq stock exchange due to its price having fallen below $1.00. On September 5, 2006, David Pierce was appointed as new CEO of Atari, replacing Bruno Bonnell. Pierce previously worked as an executive at Universal Pictures, Metro-Goldwyn-Mayer, Sony Pictures, Sony Music, and Sony Wonder.

In April 2007, Infogrames' founding chairman Bruno Bonnell left the company after 24 years; on the day of the announcement of is departure IESA's shares jumped 24%. In the same year, Infogrames fired the majority of Atari's directors and laid off 20% of its workforce. For the 2006–2007 fiscal year, Atari posted a net loss of $70 million. In July 2007, Atari sold back their exclusive Hasbro licensing deal back to Hasbro for $19 Million, which concluded with Hasbro signing a new casual game deal with Electronic Arts a month later. On November 7, GameSpot reported that Atari was beginning to run out of money, losing 12 million dollars in the first fiscal quarter of 2008.

Merger with Atari, Inc. and asset selling to Namco Bandai Games (2008–2009)
On 6 March 2008, Infogrames made an offer to Atari Inc. to buy out all remaining public shares for a value of US$1.68 per share or US$11 million total. The offer would make Infogrames the sole owner of Atari Inc., making it a privately held company. On 30 April, Atari Inc. announced its intentions to accept Infogrames' buyout offer and merge with Infogrames, which was completed by October 9. With that acquisition Infogrames was the only owner of the Atari brand. Infogrames said that it planned to reduce administrative costs and to focus on online gaming. On May 9, 2008, it was revealed that NASDAQ would be removing Atari from the NASDAQ stock exchange. Atari has stated its intentions to appeal the decision. Atari was notified of NASDAQ's final decision on April 24, 2008, and the appeal hearing took place on May 1, 2008. Atari was expected to raise its value to $15 million USD from the period of December 20, 2007 through to March 2008. Atari received notice of its absolute delisting on September 12, 2008.

In September 2008, Namco Bandai Games and Infogrames formed a joint venture called Distribution Partners. Distribution Partners was defined by Infogrames as a regrouping of "Infogrames' distribution operations in Europe, Asia, Africa and South America." This new entity consisted mainly of Infograme's distribution network in the PAL region. Distribution Partners was 34% owned by Namco Bandai and 66% owned by Atari.

In December 2008, Infogrames bought Cryptic Studios for $26.7 million in cash plus performance bonuses. Cryptic Studios is a massively multiplayer online game developer and its acquisition is in line with the company's new business strategy which focuses on online games.

In May 2009, Namco Bandai acquired Atari Europe from Infogrames. Its sale and marketing personnel were transferred to Distribution Partners. In March 2009, Infogrames announced that it was getting out of the distribution business in the PAL region with its decision to sell its 66% stake at Distribution Partners. According to an Infogrames press-release, this sale allowed "Atari to focus its financial resources and creative energy exclusively on developing and publishing online-enabled games".

In July, the deal valued at €37 million was completed; Distribution Partners was renamed to Namco Bandai Partners. At that time the company had operations in 50 countries and 17 dedicated offices.

Despite restructuring, Infogrames continued to struggle to become profitable. For the 2008 fiscal year the company posted €51.1 million ($72.17 million) in net losses and for the 2009 fiscal year, which ended in March, Infogrames posted losses of €226.1 million ($319.33 million).

Rebranding to Atari SA (2009–2013)
During their fiscal year meeting (May 2009), IESA announced that it would be changing its corporate name to an Atari branded name, in line with the use of the name for its subsidiaries. In reference to this, Atari, Inc.'s CEO Jim Wilson said: "We've gotten rid of the Infogrames and Atari duality, the confusion around that. We are one simplified company, under one management team, under one brand."

Infogrames' 29 May earnings report stated:
"The Board agreed to change Infogrames Entertainment's name to Atari. This decision will enable us to make the best use of the Atari brand, capitalising on worldwide strong name recognition and affinity, which are keys drivers to implement the Company's online, product and licensing strategies."

An earnings press release on 24 July 2009 also provided clarification regarding the ensuing name change that was initially announced some two months prior, rebranding themselves as Atari, SA from Infogrames Entertainment, SA. Furthermore, this release also stated their intentions of henceforth utilising the much more recognisable 'Atari Group' moniker with all Atari-related brands and similar such subsidiaries already under their control.

On 21 October 2010, Atari announced Atari's reference shareholders BlueBay Value Recovery (Master) Fund Limited and BlueBay Multi-Strategy (Master) Fund Limited are exploring a disposal of the shares and equity-linked instruments held by them. However, BlueBay shareholders later interrupted the sale process of its holding in Atari. BlueBay later converted the conversion of a portion of the ORANEs held by them.

In 2012, Atari, SA, BlueBay Value Recovery (Master) Fund Limited, and The BlueBay Multi-Strategy (Master) Fund Limited reached an agreement following their negotiations regarding the restructuring of the debt and capital structure of the Atari group. As part of the agreement, the €20.9 million Credit Facility Agreement was extinguished via €10.9 million loan forgiveness from BlueBay Value Recovery (Master) Fund Limited and Atari's payment of €10 million; the cancellation of the dilutive effect of the ORANEs held by BlueBay; €20 million capital increases to be submitted to the vote of Atari shareholders (of which €10 million with preferential subscription right).

Bankruptcy (2013–2014)
On 21 January 2013, Atari, Inc., Atari Interactive, Inc., Humongous, Inc. and California US Holdings, Inc. (collectively, the "Companies") filed petitions for relief under Chapter 11 of the United States Bankruptcy Code in the United States Bankruptcy Court for the Southern District of New York.

Sell-off of intellectual properties (2013–present)
In July 2013, Atari began to sell its game assets, developers and the famous "Fuji" logo and the Atari name in a bankruptcy auction. During the sale, the Battlezone and MoonBase Commander games were bought by Rebellion Developments. The Backyard Sports franchise was sold to Epic Gear LLC and later to Day 6 Sports Group LLC. Appeal Studios acquired Outcast. Glu Mobile acquired the Deer Hunter franchise. Tommo bought Humongous Inc. and over 100 different games (Including games from the companies Accolade and MicroProse, and Math Gran Prix). Nordic Games acquired the rights to Desperados and Silver. Total Annihilation and Master of Orion were sold to Wargaming and lastly, Star Control was bought by Stardock. Atari also had plans to sell off the Test Drive and RollerCoaster Tycoon franchises. Eden Games also closed down during the bankruptcy, but reopened a year later as an independent developer by its founder, David Nadal.

In 2015, Alternative Software acquired Hogs of War and Fragile Allegiance and re-released them both on Steam.

In December 2016, Atari sold the Test Drive franchise to Bigben Interactive and also sold the V-Rally series to the company without a formal announcement.

In 2017, Piko Interactive acquired several titles from Atari: 40 Winks, Bubble Ghost, Chamber of the Sci-Mutant Priestess, Death Gate, Drakkhen, Eternam, Glover, Monty Mole, Hostage: Rescue Mission, Marco Polo and Time Gate: Knight's Chase.

On 19 September 2018, THQ Nordic announced they had acquired the Alone in the Dark franchise and Act of War.

On March 3, 2020, Ziggurat Interactive acquired dozens of ex-Atari owned titles, including Deadly Dozen.

Turnaround strategy (2014–2020)
In 2014, all 3 Ataris emerged from bankruptcy and entered the social casino gaming industry with Atari Casino. Frédéric Chesnais, who heads all the slimmed down company, stated their entire operations consist of a staff of 10 people.

In 2015, Atari announced a turnaround strategy that would focus on re-releasing the catalogue of Atari games. The strategy was focused on "download games, MMO games, mobile games and licensing activities, based in priority around traditional franchises." Projects in the turnaround strategy included:
 Alone in the Dark: Illumination for PC (solo or multiplayer action and adventure game). Upon release the game was met with negative reception.
 RollerCoaster Tycoon World for PC (offline or online, solo or multiplayer game), the follow-up to RollerCoaster Tycoon 3 for PC.
 A version of Lunar Lander for mobile.

On 8 June 2017 a short teaser video was released, promoting a new product; and the following week CEO Fred Chesnais confirmed the company was developing a new game console – the hardware was stated to be based on PC technology, and be still under development. In mid July 2017 an Atari press release confirmed the existence of new hardware, referred to as the Ataribox. The casing design was inspired by the original Atari 2600, with a ribbed top surface, and a rise at the back of the console, with two styles announced: one with a wood veneer front like the original VCS, and another with a black front, akin to later 2600 units. The console was said to support both classic and current games. According to an official company statement of 22 June 2017 the product was to initially launch via a crowdfunding campaign in order to minimize financial risk to the parent company. In March 2018, the Ataribox was renamed the Atari VCS. It was released, after a delay due to the COVID-19 pandemic, in June 2021.

New leadership (2020–present)
In March 2020, Wade Rosen became the new chair of the board of directors  upon purchasing a substantial share of the company from Chesnais.

In 2020, the Atari Token was launched by Atari, in equal partnership with the ICICB Group. The group was granted with issuance license to launch an online gaming platform using crypto-currencies, including the Atari Token.

In March 2021, Atari extended its partnership with ICICB Group for the development of Atari branded hotels, with the first hotels to be constructed in Dubai, Gibraltar and Spain. The licensing agreement includes potential additional countries in Europe, Africa, and Asia.

On April 2021, Rosen replaced Chesnais as CEO and restructured the company into two units: Atari Gaming, who will focus on video games, and Atari Blockchain, who will focus on blockchain, and other businesses. On July 5, 2021, Atari Gaming announced a plan to fully reenter the console and handheld game publishing industry and reduce emphasis on free-to-play and mobile games, leading to possible titles being closed or sold, alongside the closure of Atari Casino. Chesnais later resigned from the company, though remained as a consultant and licensed through his new company, Crypto Blockchain Industries (CBI).

On November 24, 2021, Atari announced they had invested $500,000 in retro gaming streaming platform Antstream, and a deal to potentially purchase MobyGames for $1.5 million through to the end of March 2022. The purchase was completed on 8 March 2022, with Freyholtz remaining as general manager.

In March 2022, Atari ended all ties with former CEO Chesnais and CBI. The following month, they also announced the termination of all license agreements with ICICB, including the end of hotel licenses, and the dissolution of their blockchain joint venture. The Atari Token was disclaimed as "unlicensed" and a replacement would be developed.

Subsidiaries

Current

Former

Development

Publication and Distribution

Game franchises owned by Atari SA 

As of 2018, Atari SA own the rights to the following games and game franchises. The majority of these are original works by Atari, Hasbro Interactive or Infogrames, however the most notable outside of these are a large number of intellectual properties formerly belonging to Ocean Software, to which Atari SA never lost the rights.
 Adventure (Atari, Inc.)
 Air-Sea Battle (Atari, Inc.)
 Alien Brigade (Atari Corporation)
 Alpha Waves (Infogrames)
 Asteroids (Atari, Inc.)
 Avalanche (Atari, Inc.)
 Bedlam (GT Interactive)
 Black Widow (Atari, Inc.)
 Breakout (Atari, Inc.)
 Canyon Bomber (Atari, Inc.)
 Caverns of Mars (Atari, Inc.)
 Centipede (Atari, Inc.)
 Cheesy (Ocean Software)
 Circus (Atari, Inc.)
 Citytopia (Atari Interactive, Inc.)
 Crystal Castles (Atari, Inc.)
 Cybermorph (Atari Corporation)
 Desert Falcon (Atari Corporation)
 Dracula the Undead (Atari Corporation)
 Fatal Run (Atari Corporation)
 Fight for Life (Atari Corporation)
 Fighters Destiny (Ocean Software)
 Food Fight (Atari, Inc.)
 Gateway (Legend Entertainment)
 Gravitar (Atari, Inc.)
 Haunted House (Atari, Inc.)
 Hover Strike (Atari Corporation)
 Hunchback (Ocean Software)
 I, Robot (Atari, Inc.)
 Indy (Atari, Inc.)
 Jet Fighter (Kee Games/Atari, Inc.)
 Lee Enfield (Infogrames)
 Liberator (Atari, Inc.)
 Lunar Battle (Atari Interactive, Inc.)
 Lunar Lander (Atari, Inc.)
 Match Day (Ocean Software)
 Missile Command (Atari, Inc.)
 Mr. Nutz (Ocean Software)
 Ninja Golf (Atari Corporation)
 Night Driver (Atari, Inc.)
 Outlaw (Atari, Inc.)
 Pong (Atari, Inc.)
 Quadrun (Atari, Inc.)
 RealSports (Atari, Inc.)
 Rollercoaster Tycoon (Hasbro Interactive)
 Save Mary! (Atari Corporation)
 Section 8 (Timegate Studios)
 Secret Quest (Atari Corporation)
 Sprint 2 (Kee Games/Atari, Inc.)
 Star Raiders (Atari, Inc.)
 Starshot: Space Circus Fever (Infogrames)
 Swordquest (Atari, Inc.)
 Tank (Kee Games/Atari, Inc.)
 Tempest (Atari, Inc.)
 The Wheel of Time (Legend Entertainment)
 Ultra Vortek (Atari Corporation)
 Video Olympics (Atari, Inc.)
 Warbirds (Atari Corporation)
 Warlords (Atari, Inc.)
 Where Time Stood Still (Ocean Software)
 Wizball (Ocean Software)
 Yars' Revenge (Atari, Inc.)
 Zapper: One Wicked Cricket (Infogrames)

References

External links 
 

 
Blockchain entities
Companies based in Paris
Companies listed on Euronext Paris
Companies formerly listed on Nasdaq Stockholm
French companies established in 1983
Holding companies established in 1983
Holding companies of France
Video game companies established in 1983
Video game companies of France
Video game development companies
Video game publishers